Chad Jordan Wingard (born 29 July 1993) is a professional Australian rules footballer playing for the Hawthorn Football Club in the Australian Football League (AFL). He was drafted to Port Adelaide with the sixth selection in the 2011 AFL Draft from the Sturt Football Club in the South Australian Football League (SANFL).

Early life
Wingard was born in Murray Bridge, South Australia. He went to Unity College Murray bridge. His father Trevor is part of the Indigenous Australian Kaurna people and his mother Julie is Irish. Julie works at an emergency accommodation centre. Chad has an older brother and a younger brother, as well as five younger foster siblings. At 16 and 60 kg, Wingard was a member of Murray Bridge's 2009 Imperial Football Club league team that won the River Murray Football League premiership. In that game, he kicked five goals.

Wingard also played basketball as a kid, and was the captain of South Australia's under-16 basketball team.

AFL career 

Wingard made his debut for Port Adelaide in round 19, 2012 against St Kilda. His breakout game came during Port Adelaide's round 22, 2012 loss to the Brisbane Lions where he received an AFL Rising Star nomination for his 27 disposal, 1 goal and 5 mark performance.

For season 2013, which was only his second season, he averaged 21.3 disposals a game and kicked 43 goals. He was named in the 2013 All-Australian team, making him the youngest player to make an All-Australian team since Mark Ricciuto in 1994. Wingard's 2013 season also saw him win the Showdown Medal for his five-goal performance in round 19 against the Adelaide Crows where he was described after the match as "Port's most exciting player since Gavin Wanganeen." At season's end, he was rewarded with the John Cahill Medal, making him the youngest player to win a best and fairest at Port Adelaide since Craig Bradley in 1982.

Wingard's 2014 season saw his averages drop from 21 disposals per game to 16 per game, however he still managed to kick 43 goals in total. He won the Mark of the Year in round 12 against St Kilda by jumping high on the shoulders of Sean Dempster.

Season 2015 is considered Wingard's greatest season to date. He booted a career high 53 goals to be the club's leading goal kicker of the season by kicking multiple goals in every game from rounds 8 to 22 as well as kicking at least one goal in every game until round 23. Wingard also averaged 19.2 disposals a game and was recognised with the All-Australian selection, a stunning achievement for a player having completed just his fourth year at AFL level.

At the conclusion of the 2018 season, Wingard sought a trade from Port Adelaide. He eventually requested a trade to Hawthorn, and was traded on 17 October.

Hawthorn

Hawthorn traded their first round pick and promising youngster Ryan Burton for Wingard. During the preseason Wingard developed a calf complaint that forced him to miss all the warm up games and the first two games of the 2019 season. He made his debut for his new club against  and kicked three goals to help win the match.

Statistics 
Updated to the end of the 2022 season.

|-
| 2012 ||  || 20
| 19 || 9 || 10 || 108 || 129 || 237 || 36 || 46 || 0.5 || 0.5 || 5.7 || 6.8 || 12.5 || 1.9 || 2.4 || 0
|-
| 2013 ||  || 20
| 24 || 43 || 20 || 309 || 200 || 509 || 104 || 47 || 1.8 || 0.8 || 12.9 || 8.3 || 21.2 || 4.3 || 2.0 || 8
|-
| 2014 ||  || 20
| 24 || 43 || 31 || 243 || 147 || 390 || 94 || 74 || 1.8 || 1.3 || 10.1 || 6.1 || 16.3 || 3.9 || 3.1 || 6
|-
| 2015 ||  || 20
| 22 || 53 || 27 || 270 ||152 || 422 || 85 || 67 || 2.4 || 1.2 || 12.3 || 6.9 || 19.2 || 3.9 || 3.1 || 6
|-
| 2016 ||  || 20
| 18 || 38 || 24 || 181 || 97 || 278 || 52 || 39 || 2.1 || 1.3 || 10.1 || 5.4 || 15.4 || 2.9 || 2.2 || 3
|-
| 2017 ||  || 20
| 19 || 24 || 25 || 262 || 159 || 421 || 82 || 63 || 1.3 || 1.3 || 13.8 || 8.4 || 22.2 || 4.3 || 3.3 || 4
|-
| 2018 ||  || 20
| 21 || 22 || 21 || 252 || 185 || 437 || 58 || 70 || 1.0 || 1.0 || 12.0 || 8.8 || 20.8 || 2.8 || 3.3 || 4
|-
| 2019 ||  || 20
| 14 || 12 || 9 || 147 || 112 || 259 || 45 || 60 || 0.9 || 0.6 || 10.5 || 8.0 || 18.5 || 3.2 || 4.3 || 4
|-
| 2020 ||  || 20
| 17 || 18 || 11 || 145 || 106 || 251 || 49 || 61 || 1.1 || 0.6 || 8.5 || 6.2 || 14.8 || 2.9 || 3.6 || 6
|-
| 2021 ||  || 20
| 16 || 12 || 11 || 199 || 158 || 357 || 58 || 61 || 0.8 || 0.7 || 12.4 || 9.9 || 22.3 || 3.6 || 3.8 || 8
|-
| 2022 ||  || 20
| 10 || 17 || 6 || 78 || 45 || 123 || 21 || 22 || 1.7 || 0.6 || 7.8 || 4.5 || 12.3 || 2.1 || 2.2 || 0
|- class="sortbottom"
! colspan="3" | Career
! 204 !! 291 !! 195 !! 2194 !! 1490 !! 3684 !! 684 !! 610 !! 1.4 !! 1.0 !! 10.8 !! 7.3 !! 18.1 !! 3.4 !! 3.0 !! 49
|}

Notes

Honours and achievements
Individual
 2× All-Australian team: 2013, 2015
 John Cahill Medal: 2013
 2× Port Adelaide leading club goalkicker: 2015, 2016
 Showdown Medal: R19, 2013
 AFL Rising Star nominee: 2012
 2× Australian international rules football team: 2014, 2017
 Indigenous All-Stars team: 2013
 3× 22 Under 22 team: 2013, 2014, 2015
 Under 18 All-Australian team: 2011
 South Australia Under 18s captain: 2011

References

External links

Footywire statistics

1993 births
Living people
Hawthorn Football Club players
Port Adelaide Football Club players
Port Adelaide Football Club players (all competitions)
Australian rules footballers from South Australia
Australian people of Irish descent
Indigenous Australian players of Australian rules football
Sturt Football Club players
All-Australians (AFL)
John Cahill Medal winners
Australia international rules football team players